Agincourt or Matsavana is a town in Bushbuckridge Local Municipality in the Mpumalanga province of South Africa.

Agincourt lies 100 km north of the border with Eswatini and 90 km east of the border with Mozambique.

To the west of Agincourt lies the Kruger National Park. The MRC/Wits Rural Public Health and Health Transitions Research Unit is based in Agincourt.

References
Agincourt is in the west of Kruger National Park and versa versa and is also in the west of the border of Mozambique.

https://www.agincourt.co.za/ – The website of the MRC/Wits Rural Public Health and Health Transitions Research Unit

Populated places in the Bushbuckridge Local Municipality